Cody Cole (born 28 May 1990) is a New Zealand male weightlifter, competing in the 69 kg category and representing New Zealand at international competitions. He participated at the 2014 Commonwealth Games in the 69 kg event.

Major competitions

References

1990 births
Living people
New Zealand male weightlifters
Place of birth missing (living people)
Weightlifters at the 2014 Commonwealth Games
Commonwealth Games competitors for New Zealand
20th-century New Zealand people
21st-century New Zealand people